Orcades can refer to:

Geography
 Orcades (islands), the ancient name of the Orkney Islands
 Orcades (Roman province), an apocryphal Roman province over Orkney

Transportation 
 , a ship formerly named Prinz Ludwig (1906)
 , a ship torpedoed and sunk during the Second World War
 , a cruise ship in service until 1972